Anyin, also known as Agni, Agny, and Anyi, is a Niger-Congo language spoken mainly in Côte d'Ivoire and Ghana. It is a Kwa language of the Central Tano branch, forming a dialect continuum with Baoulé, and is closely related to Nzema and Sehwi. Its dialects, divided into Northern and Central dialect areas, include Sannvin, Abé, Ano, Bona, Bini, and Barabo in the Northern area and Ndenye and Juablin in the Central area. In Côte d'Ivoire, there are approximately 1.45 million native speakers of Anyin, along with 10,000 second-language users; in Ghana, there are approximately 66,400 speakers.

Morofo, spoken by 300,000 in southeastern Côte d'Ivoire, is sometimes classified as a dialect of Anyin, but may also be classified as a separate language.

Phonology

Consonants

Vowels 

Of these vowels, five may be nasalized: /ĩ/, /ɪ̃/, /ã/, /ũ/, and /ʊ̃/.

Tones 
Anyin has two level tones, high and mid; two contour tones, high-low and low-high; and one neutral tone. Tones are distinguished orthographically only to distinguish minimal pairs and grammatical constructions, or when two otherwise identical vowels with differing tones co-occur: cf. ⟨baá⟩ ([bàá], "child") vs. ⟨ba⟩ ([bá], "to arrive", "to come").

Grammar

Pronouns 
Anyin uses the following pronouns:

See also 
 Baoulé language
 Nzema language
 Sehwi language

References

External links 
 PanAfriL10n page on Anyi & Baule

Central Tano languages
Languages of Ivory Coast
Languages of Ghana